Somali Airlines was the flag carrier of Somalia. Established in 1964, it offered flights to both domestic and international destinations. It operated Boeing 720Bs, Boeing 707-300s and Airbus A310-300s on a network to the Middle East and Europe. The airline discontinued operations after the start of the civil war in the early 1990s, when the country fell into anarchy. A reconstituted Somali government later began preparations in 2012 for an expected relaunch of the carrier, with the first new Somali Airlines aircraft scheduled for delivery by the end of December 2013.

History

General
Somali Airlines was founded on 5 March 1964 as the newly independent Somalia's national airline. The country's then civilian government and Alitalia owned equal shares in the company, with each holding a 50% controlling stake. Under a five-year agreement, Alitalia provided the airline with technical support. According to Somali Airlines' Director at the time, Abdulahi Shireh, the carrier was established primarily to more effectively connect the capital Mogadishu to other regions in the nation.

Shortly after the carrier was formed, four Douglas DC-3s were donated by the United States. Prior to this, local services had been operated by Aden Airways. The Mogadishu–Aden run kept being flown under a pool agreement with Aden Airways until March 1965, when Somali Airlines embarked on serving the route to this destination with its own aircraft. It was discontinued in  the same year, after the carrier was banned from flying into Kenyan airspace following Radio Mogadishu airing verbal attacks against the Kenyan President Jomo Kenyatta.

At , the airline's president was Abdi Mohamed Namus, who employed 120 workers. At this time, the fleet consisted of two Cessna 185s, three DC-3s and four Viscount 700s. One of these Viscounts (6O-AAJ) experienced an accident while landing at Mogadishu on 6 May 1970. The aircraft was on final approach when the crew realised that the flight controls were not responding. Control of the aircraft was partly gained by the use of power, but the airframe landed hard, causing the nose gear to collapse. Five people perished in the accident, out of 30 occupants on board. In late 1975, two Fokker F27s were acquired. In 1976, the company purchased two Boeing 720Bs from American Airlines, the two last ones in service with the American carrier. It also ordered a further two Boeing 707s. Somali Airlines later became a fully state-owned company in 1977, when the government acquired 49% of the shares held by Alitalia.

By , the fleet consisted of two Boeing 707-320Cs, two Boeing 720Bs, two Fokker F27-600s, two DC-3s, one Cessna 402 and one Cessna 180. Colonel Mohamoud Gulaid was appointed chairman and CEO during 1983. At , the number of employees was 714 and the fleet had reduced to include two Boeing 707-320Cs and two F.27-600s, with routes operated from Berbera and Mogadishu to Abu Dhabi, Cairo, Frankfurt, Jeddah, Nairobi and Rome. In , a new route to Banjul and Conakry was launched, and a firm order for an Airbus A310-300 was placed late that year, with an option for another one; the aircraft was aimed at replacing the 707 fleet on routes to Europe and the Middle East.

Due to the outbreak of the civil war in the early 1990s, all of the carrier's operations were officially suspended in 1991. The void created by the collapse of the airline has since been filled by various Somali-owned private carriers, such as Jubba Airways, Daallo Airlines and Puntair.

Relaunch
In April 2012, former Somali Airlines pilots, Abikar Nur and Ahmed Elmi Gure, met with aviation officials at the Lufthansa Flight Training Center in Phoenix, United States, to discuss the possibility of resuming the historic working relationship between Somali Airlines and Lufthansa. The meeting ended with a pledge by the school's chairman, Captain Matthias Kippenberg, to assist the Somali aviation authorities in training prospective pilots.

In July 2012, Mohammed Osman Ali (Dhagah-tur), the General Director of the Ministry of Aviation and Transport, announced that the Somali government had begun preparations to revive the national carrier, Somali Airlines. The Somali authorities along with the Somali Civil Aviation Steering Committee (SCASC) — a joint commission composed of officials from Somalia's federal and regional governments as well as members of the CACAS, ICAO/TCB and UNDP — convened with international aviation groups in Montreal to request support for the ongoing rehabilitation efforts. The SCASC set a three-year window for reconstruction of the national civil aviation capacity. It also requested the complete transfer of Somali civil aviation operations and assets from the CACAS caretaker body to the Somali authorities.

In November 2013, the German-based Skyliner reported that a new Boeing 737-400 cargo airliner was scheduled to be transferred from Budapest airport to Mogadishu by the end of December. The plane was concurrently being painted in the Somali national colours ahead of delivery. A staff representative for the Slovakian SAMair company, Zsolt Kovács, also indicated that another aircraft was also undergoing construction at the airport and that both planes had been purchased from SAMair by the Somali federal authorities on behalf of Somali Airlines.

Destinations
The following is a list of destinations the airline served throughout its history:

Fleet

Somali Airlines operated the following aircraft all through its history:

Airbus A310-200
Airbus A310-300
Boeing 707-120B
Boeing 707-320
Boeing 707-320B
Boeing 707-320C
Boeing 720B
Boeing 727-200
Douglas C-47A
Fokker F27-200
Fokker F27-600
Viscount 742D

Accidents and incidents
According to Aviation Safety Network, Somali Airlines experienced six events throughout its history; five of the occurrences carried with the hull-loss of the aircraft involved, and three of them had fatalities.

See also

Transport in Somalia

References

Bibliography

External links

 Somali Civil Aviation Authority 

Defunct airlines of Somalia
Airlines established in 1964
Airlines disestablished in 1991
20th century in Mogadishu
1964 establishments in Africa
1991 disestablishments in Somalia
Companies based in Mogadishu